Cool Branch is a  long 2nd order tributary to Tubbs Branch in Sussex County, Delaware.

Course
Cool Branch rises about 2 miles northwest of Sycamore, Delaware, and then flows northwest to join Tubbs Branch about 0.5 miles south of Concord.

Watershed
Cool Branch drains  of area, receives about 45.0 in/year of precipitation, has a wetness index of 681.87, and is about 8% forested.

See also
List of rivers of Delaware

References

Rivers of Delaware
Rivers of Sussex County, Delaware